Jeffrey C. Otah (born June 17, 1986) is a Nigerian American former American football offensive tackle. He was drafted by the Carolina Panthers in the first round of the 2008 NFL Draft.

Early years
Otah moved to The Bronx at the age of seven, then moved to New Castle, Delaware at the age of thirteen. He played high school football at William Penn High School in New Castle, Delaware.

Professional career

2008 NFL Draft
Coming in the 2008 NFL Draft Otah was considered by many scouts to be a top tackle prospect. The Carolina Panthers were reportedly very interested in him, evident by them sending head coach John Fox and General Manager Marty Hurney to his pro-day.

Carolina Panthers
Reports of the Panthers being interested in Otah proved to be well founded after the team made a trade with the Philadelphia Eagles to trade up and to select him. He was selected with the 19th pick in the first round. Jeff became an immediate starter at right tackle early in training camp. He started in 12 of the possible 16 games his first season missing 4 due to injury.

Otah started the 2010 season recovering from what was then thought to be relatively minor knee surgery performed in mid-August. But on 9 November, the Panthers placed Otah on injured reserve, ending his season without him ever taking the field.

Otah's knee problems persisted into the 2011 season, and he was placed on injured reserve again on 19 October 2011, after missing two of six games.

Otah was traded to the New York Jets for an undisclosed draft pick on July 23, 2012 contingent on his passing a physical for the team. After failing the initial test, the Jets placed Otah on the PUP/Active list on July 25. He had seven days to pass the test again or the trade would be nullified. On July 31, Otah failed his second physical thus voiding the trade and returning him to the Panthers. Otah was released by the Panthers two days later.

References

External links

Carolina Panthers Bio
Pittsburgh Panthers bio

1986 births
Living people
American football offensive tackles
American sportspeople of Nigerian descent
Carolina Panthers players
Nigerian players of American football
People from New Castle, Delaware
Pittsburgh Panthers football players
Players of American football from Delaware
Sportspeople from the Delaware Valley